Wilson Lo (born November 27, 1991) is a politician in Ottawa, Ontario, Canada. He is the city councillor for Barrhaven East Ward on Ottawa City Council, and is the first City Councillor of Chinese descent.

Background
Lo was born in Vancouver, and grew up in Markham, Ontario to parents from Hong Kong. He moved to Ottawa in 2009 to attend Carleton University, where he received a degree in journalism.

Prior to being elected, Lo was a customer communications officer for OC Transpo. He was formerly an OC Transpo driver.

Politics
Lo was elected to city council in the 2022 Ottawa municipal election, becoming the first councillor elected to represent the new ward of Barrhaven East. Lo also became the city's first-ever Chinese Canadian city councillor. Lo ran on a platform of widening Greenbank Road, Prince of Wales Drive, upgrading and adding pathways in the Greenbelt, restructuring transit service and making streets safer. He won 37% of the vote, defeating teacher Richard Garrick, and Ottawa Catholic School Board trustee Patrick Brennan, among others. During his campaign, he claimed to have canvassed all 17,006 homes in his ward.

Electoral record

|-
!rowspan="2" colspan="2"|Candidate
!colspan="3"|Popular vote
!rowspan="2" colspan="2"|Expenditures
|-
! Votes
! %
! ±%
|-
| style="background-color:#FFD966;" |
| style="text-align:left;"  | Wilson Lo
| style="text-align:right;" | 4,403
| style="text-align:right;" | 36.82
| style="text-align:right;" | –
| style="text-align:right;" |
|-
| style="background-color:#7BB5B2;" |
| style="text-align:left;"  | Richard Garrick
| style="text-align:right;" | 2,980
| style="text-align:right;" | 24.92
| style="text-align:right;" | –
| style="text-align:right;" |
|-
| style="background-color:#49606E;" |
| style="text-align:left;"  | Patrick Brennan
| style="text-align:right;" | 2,153
| style="text-align:right;" | 18.00
| style="text-align:right;" | –
| style="text-align:right;" |
|-
| style="background-color:#5f4ac1;" |
| style="text-align:left;"  | Kathleen Caught
| style="text-align:right;" | 888
| style="text-align:right;" | 7.43
| style="text-align:right;" | –
| style="text-align:right;" |
|-
| style="background-color:#f8ece4;" |
| style="text-align:left;"  | Atiq Qureshi
| style="text-align:right;" | 778
| style="text-align:right;" | 6.51
| style="text-align:right;" | –
| style="text-align:right;" |
|-
| style="background-color:#0874a2;" |
| style="text-align:left;"  | Guy Boone
| style="text-align:right;" | 516
| style="text-align:right;" | 4.32
| style="text-align:right;" | –
| style="text-align:right;" |
|-
| style="background-color:#F5B341;" |
| style="text-align:left;"  | Dominik Janelle
| style="text-align:right;" | 240
| style="text-align:right;" | 2.01
| style="text-align:right;" | –
| style="text-align:right;" |
|-
| style="text-align:right;background-color:#FFFFFF;" colspan="2" |Total valid votes
| style="text-align:right;background-color:#FFFFFF;" | 11,958
| style="text-align:right;background-color:#FFFFFF;" | 97.66
| style="text-align:right;background-color:#c2c2c2;" colspan="2" |
|-
| style="text-align:right;background-color:#FFFFFF;" colspan="2" |Total rejected, unmarked and declined votes
| style="text-align:right;background-color:#FFFFFF;" | 286
| style="text-align:right;background-color:#FFFFFF;" | 2.34
| style="text-align:right;background-color:#c2c2c2;" colspan="2" |
|-
| style="text-align:right;background-color:#FFFFFF;" colspan="2" |Turnout
| style="text-align:right;background-color:#FFFFFF;" | 12,244
| style="text-align:right;background-color:#FFFFFF;" | 39.11
| style="text-align:right;background-color:#FFFFFF;" |
| style="text-align:right;background-color:#c2c2c2;" |
|- 
| style="text-align:right;background-color:#FFFFFF;" colspan="2" |Eligible voters
| style="text-align:right;background-color:#FFFFFF;" | 31,307
| style="text-align:right;background-color:#c2c2c2;" colspan="3" |
|- 
| style="text-align:left;" colspan="6" |Note: Candidate campaign colours are based on the prominent colour used in campaign items (signs, literature, etc.)and are used as a visual differentiation between candidates.
|- 
| style="text-align:left;" colspan="13" |Sources: 
|}

References

Living people
Ottawa city councillors
Carleton University alumni
Canadian politicians of Hong Kong descent
Politicians from Vancouver
People from Markham, Ontario
1991 births
Bus drivers